Gintarė Skaistė (born 4 August 1981) is a Lithuanian politician, Member of the Seimas for Panemunė constituency, economist and PhD of Social Sciences. She was Kaunas City Councillor between 2007 and 2016.

On 7 December 2020, Skaistė was approved to be the Minister of Finance in the Šimonytė Cabinet.

Education and early career
Skaistė graduated from Kaunas University of Technology in 2010, receiving a bachelor's degree in Economics. She holds master's degree in Economics (2011) from Mykolas Romeris University, and a PhD in Social Sciences (2016).

She worked as an expert at the Lithuanian Social Market Development Institute. Skaistė also is a Member of Lithuanian Riflemen's Union and Honorary Member of the Lithuanian Community of the Atlantic Treaty.

Political career
Since 2005 Skaistė has been a member of the Homeland Union. Between 2007 and 2016 she was Kaunas City Councillor. In 2016 she was elected as Member of the Seimas of the Republic of Lithuania.

Other activities
 European Bank for Reconstruction and Development (EBRD), Ex-Officio Member of the Board of Governors (since 2020)
 European Stability Mechanism (ESM), Member of the Board of Governors (since 2020)
 Nordic Investment Bank (NIB), Ex-Officio Member of the Board of Governors (since 2020)
 World Bank, Ex-Officio Member of the Board of Governors (since 2020)

References
 https://www.lrs.lt/sip/portal.show?p_r=35299&p_k=1&p_a=498&p_asm_id=71923

1981 births
Living people
Politicians from Kaunas
Women members of the Seimas
Homeland Union politicians
Members of the Seimas
21st-century Lithuanian politicians
Ministers of Finance of Lithuania
Female finance ministers
Women government ministers of Lithuania
Mykolas Romeris University alumni
Kaunas University of Technology alumni
21st-century Lithuanian women politicians